Giovanni Giacomazzi (18 January 1928 – 12 December 1995) was an Italian footballer who played as a defender.

Club career
Giacomazzi rose the ranks quickly having in one year gone from Serie D to Inter in Serie A, where he remained for eight seasons. A classic player, he was known for his humility, dedication, and work-rate. Strong, bold, and determined in only a year he earned the starting spot and the club's #3 shirt. Soon he formed the central part of a defence which was strong enough to help the team win two championships (in 1953 and 1954) and earn a call up to the national team. As a veteran player, he went to Alessandria where he played three seasons in Serie A and four in Serie B along with a talented youngster in Gianni Rivera.

International career
Giovanni Giacomazzi was one of five players that played every game for Italy at the 1954 World Cup (the others being Lorenzi, Nesti, Pandolfini and Tognon). He won eight consecutive caps with Italy between 1954 and 1955.

References
 La Gazzetta dello Sport

1928 births
1995 deaths
Italian footballers
Association football defenders
Italy international footballers
1954 FIFA World Cup players
Inter Milan players
U.S. Alessandria Calcio 1912 players
U.C. Sampdoria players
Calcio Padova players
U.S. Cremonese players
Serie A players